Lala Rural College, established in 1964, is a general degree college situated at Lala, in Hailakandi district, Assam. This college is affiliated with the Assam University.

Departments

Arts and Commerce
Bengali
English
Manipuri
Persian
History
Education
Economics
Philosophy
Political Science
Commerce

References

External links
 

Universities and colleges in Assam
Colleges affiliated to Assam University
Educational institutions established in 1964
1964 establishments in Assam